Fairmount Wildlife Management Area is a Wildlife Management Area in Somerset County, Maryland. It is located on the Eastern Shore of Maryland along the Chesapeake Bay between the Manokin and Annemessex Rivers in Somerset County. American black duck, northern pintail, gadwall, American wigeon, blue and green-winged teal, and many other species of waterfowl can be found in the area.

References

External links
 Fairmount Wildlife Management Area

Wildlife management areas of Maryland
Protected areas of Somerset County, Maryland
IUCN Category V